Chicago hosted the 1893 World's Columbian Exposition, a world's fair commemorating the 400th anniversary of Christopher Columbus's arrival in the New World. Artists from the United States and 19 foreign countries exhibited at the Exposition. A complete list of the artists and works exhibited in the Palace of Fine Arts can be found here:

The Art Department's focus was on modern American painting, works painted in the 17 years since the 1876 Centennial Exposition. Hundreds of American painters submitted works, and more than 1,000 paintings in oil and more than 200 in watercolor were selected for exhibition in the Palace of Fine Arts. Additional works—not in competition for medals—were exhibited in other Exposition buildings, including the Woman's Building and individual state buildings.

The tradition of the Paris Salon was to award a single gold medal (first place), a couple silver medals (second place), several bronze medals (third place), and numerous honorable mentions (fourth place) in each medium (oils, watercolor, sculpture, etc.). Instead of this tiered system with medals awarded for individual paintings, Exposition judges awarded one level of medals that was for an artist's whole exhibit. Fifty-seven American painters received medals "for excellence" for works in oil, and 11 for works in watercolor.

Author Henry Davenport Northrop made a key observation:

The American artists are practically of three classes—those who have studied entirely in this country; those who have studied abroad, but have returned to America and partly shaken off the foreign influence; and those who have remained abroad, painting very much like the artists of the country in which they live.

The Exposition closed at the end of October 1893. Many of its buildings were destroyed in a July 1894 fire that swept through the vacant fairgrounds.

About this list
The table below lists American painters who received special recognition, and/or whose exhibited works can be found in the Smithsonian Institution Research Information System database: Except where noted, the paintings were exhibited in the United States section of the Palace of Fine Arts and listed in the initial catalogue. A revised catalogue listed a small number of additional paintings. Images of the works have been added, where available, as well as their current whereabouts.

Notes

References

World
World
Artist
1893 in art